Heliomeris multiflora is a North American species of flowering plants in the family Asteraceae called the showy goldeneye. It grows in Mexico and the western United States from Montana to Jalisco.

Leaves are up to 16 cm (6.3 in) long, with hairs along the edges. One plant can produce 25 or more yellow flower heads, each head with 12-14 ray flowers surrounding 50 or more tiny disc flowers.

Varieties
Heliomeris multiflora var. brevifolia (Greene ex Wooton & Standl.) - Arizona, New Mexico, Utah
Heliomeris multiflora var. multiflora - from Idaho and Montana south to Durango
Heliomeris multiflora var. nevadensis (A.Nelson) W.F.Yates - from California east to Utah and south to Jalisco

References

External links
USDA Plants Profile

Heliantheae
Flora of Mexico
Flora of the Western United States
Plants described in 1848
Flora without expected TNC conservation status